The 2003 FC Rubin Kazan season was the club's 1st season in the Russian Premier League, the highest tier of association football in Russia. They finished the season in third position, qualifying for the 2004–05 UEFA Cup, and reached the Round of 32 in the Russian Cup, with the Round of 16 taking place in the 2004 season.

Season review

Squad

On loan

Left club during season

Transfers

In

Out

Loans in

Loans out

Released

Competitions

Premier League

Results by round

Results

League table

Russian Cup

2003-04

The Round of 16 games took place during the 2004 season.

Squad statistics

Appearances and goals

|-
|colspan="14"|Players away from the club on loan:

|-
|colspan="14"|Players who appeared for Rubin Kazan but left during the season:

|}

Goal scorers

Disciplinary record

References

FC Rubin Kazan seasons
Rubin Kazan